Geissanthus pichinchae is a species of plant in the family Primulaceae. It is endemic to Ecuador.

References

pichinchae
Endemic flora of Ecuador
Near threatened flora of South America
Taxonomy articles created by Polbot